Atiqah or Atikah is a feminine given name which is used in the Arab world and in Muslim majority countries.

Atiqah may refer to:

People
Atikah bint Yazid, Muhammad's great-grandmother
Atikah bint Murrah, great-great grandmother of Muhammad
Atika bint Abdul Muttalib, aunt of Muhammad
Atiqa bint Zayd ibn Amr ibn Nufayl (former wife of Abdullah ibn Abu Bakr married 'Umar in the year 12 Anno hegiræ and after 'Umar was murdered, she married az-Zubayr ibn al-Awwam

Notes

Arabic feminine given names